Hesudra haighti is a moth of the family Erebidae. It was described by Wileman and South in 1919. It is found on Luzon in the Philippines.

References

Lithosiina
Moths described in 1919